= BANM =

BANM may refer to:

- Bell Atlantic/NYNEX mobile
- British Approved Name (Modified)
